Glenn Michael Goldup (born April 26, 1953) is a Canadian former professional ice hockey player who played 291 games in the National Hockey League (NHL). He played for the Montreal Canadiens and Los Angeles Kings. As a youth, he played in the 1965 Quebec International Pee-Wee Hockey Tournament with the Toronto Torrids minor ice hockey team. Born in Toronto, Ontario, his father Hank Goldup also played professional hockey in the NHL.

Career statistics
                                            --- Regular Season ---  ---- Playoffs ----
Season   Team                        Lge    GP    G    A  Pts  PIM  GP   G   A Pts PIM
--------------------------------------------------------------------------------------
1969-70  Toronto Marlboros           OHA     2    0    1    1    0  --  --  --  --  --
1970-71  Toronto Marlboros           OHA    58   12   22   34   82  --  --  --  --  --
1971-72  Toronto Marlboros           OHA    63   24   34   58  161  --  --  --  --  --
1972-73  Toronto Marlboros           OHA    54   42   53   95  173  --  --  --  --  --
1973-74  Nova-Scotia Voyageurs       AHL    44   18   15   33   64  --  --  --  --  --
1973-74  Montreal Canadiens          NHL     6    0    0    0    0  --  --  --  --  --
1974-75  Nova-Scotia Voyageurs       AHL    49   15   16   31  140   5   1   4   5  36
1974-75  Montreal Canadiens          NHL     9    0    1    1    2  --  --  --  --  --
1975-76  Nova-Scotia Voyageurs       AHL    65   23   22   45  131   9   8   3  11  33
1975-76  Montreal Canadiens          NHL     3    0    0    0    2  --  --  --  --  --
1976-77  Los Angeles Kings           NHL    28    7    6   13   29   8   2   2   4   2
1976-77  Fort Worth Texans           CHL     7    2    2    4    9  --  --  --  --  --
1977-78  Los Angeles Kings           NHL    66   14   18   32   66   2   1   0   1  11
1978-79  Los Angeles Kings           NHL    73   15   22   37   89   2   0   1   1   9
1979-80  Los Angeles Kings           NHL    55   10   11   21   78   4   1   0   1   0
1980-81  New Haven Nighthawks        AHL    15    6    2    8   36   3   0   0   0   0
1980-81  Los Angeles Kings           NHL    49    6    9   15   35  --  --  --  --  --
1981-82  New Haven Nighthawks        AHL    51   14   17   31   91   4   3   1   4   2
1981-82  Los Angeles Kings           NHL     2    0    0    0    2  --  --  --  --  --
1982-83  New Haven Nighthawks        AHL    28    0    8    8   39  --  --  --  --  --
1983-84  New Haven Nighthawks        AHL     1    0    0    0    0  --  --  --  --  --
--------------------------------------------------------------------------------------
         NHL Totals                        291   52   67  119  303  16   4   3   7  22

References

External links

1953 births
Living people
Canadian ice hockey forwards
Los Angeles Kings players
Montreal Canadiens draft picks
Montreal Canadiens players
New England Whalers draft picks
Ice hockey people from Toronto
Toronto Marlboros players
World Hockey Association first round draft picks